Haecceity (from the Latin haecceitas, which translates as "thisness") is a term from medieval scholastic philosophy, first coined by followers of Duns Scotus to denote a concept that he seems to have originated: the irreducible determination of a thing that makes it this particular thing. Haecceity is a person's or object's thisness, the individualising difference between the concept "a man" and the concept "Socrates" (i.e., a specific person). In modern philosophy of physics, it is sometimes referred to as primitive thisness.

Etymology
Haecceity is a Latin neologism formed as an abstract noun derived from the demonstrative pronoun "haec(ce)", meaning "this (very)" (feminine singular) or "these (very)" (feminine or neuter plural). It is apparently formed on the model of another (much older) neologism, viz. "qui(d)ditas" ("whatness"), which is a calque of Aristotle's Greek to ti esti (τὸ τί ἐστι) or "the what (it) is."

Haecceity vs. quiddity
Haecceity may be defined in some dictionaries as simply the "essence" of a thing, or as a simple synonym for quiddity or hypokeimenon. However, in proper philosophical usage these terms have not only distinct but opposite meanings. Whereas haecceity refers to aspects of a thing that make it a particular thing, quiddity refers to the universal qualities of a thing, its "whatness", or the aspects of a thing it may share with other things and by which it may form part of a genus of things.

Haecceity in scholasticism
Duns Scotus makes the following distinction:

In Scotism and the scholastic usage in general, therefore, "haecceity" properly means the irreducible individuating differentia which together with the specific essence (i.e. quiddity) constitutes the individual (or the individual essence), in analogy to the way specific differentia combined with the genus (or generic essence) constitutes the species (or specific essence). Haecceity differs, however, from the specific differentia, by not having any conceptually specifiable content: it does not add any further specification to the whatness of a thing but merely determines it to be a particular unrepeatable instance of the kind specified by the quiddity. This is connected with Aristotle's notion that an individual cannot be defined.

Individuals are more perfect than the specific essence and thus have not solely a higher degree of unity, but also a greater degree of truth and goodness. God multiplied individuals to communicate to them His goodness and beatitude.

Haecceity in anglophone philosophy
In analytical philosophy, the meaning of "haecceity" shifted somewhat. Charles Sanders Peirce  used the term as a non-descriptive reference to an individual. Alvin Plantinga and other analytical philosophers used "haecceity" in the sense of "individual essence". The "haecceity" of analytical philosophers thus comprises not only the individuating differentia (the scholastic hacceity) but the entire essential determination of an individual (i.e., including that which the scholastics would call its quiddity).

Haecceity in sociology and continental philosophy
Harold Garfinkel, the founder of ethnomethodology, used the term "haecceity", to emphasize the unavoidable and irremediable indexical character of any expression, behavior or situation. For Garfinkel indexicality was not a problem. He treated the haecceities and contingencies of social practices as a resource for making sense together. In contrast to theoretical generalizations, Garfinkel introduced "haecceities" in "Parson's Plenum" (1988), to indicate the importance of the infinite contingencies in both situations and practices for the local accomplishment of social order. According to Garfinkel, members display and produce the social order they refer to within the setting that they contribute to. The study of practical action and situations in their "haecceities" — aimed at disclosing the ordinary, ongoing social order that is constructed by the members' practices — is the work of ethnomethodology. Garfinkel described ethnomethodological studies as investigations of "haecceities", i.e.,

Gilles Deleuze uses the term in a different way to denote entities that exist on the plane of immanence. The usage was likely chosen in line with his esoteric concept of difference and individuation, and critique of object-centered metaphysics.

Michael Lynch (1991) described the ontological production of objects in the natural sciences as "assemblages of haecceities", thereby offering an alternate reading of Deleuze and Guattari's (1980) discussion of "memories of haecceity" in the light of Garfinkel's treatment of "haecceity".

Other uses
Gerard Manley Hopkins drew on Scotus — whom he described as “of reality the rarest-veined unraveller” — to construct his poetic theory of inscape.

James Joyce made similar use of the concept of haecceitas to develop his idea of the secular epiphany.

James Wood refers extensively to haecceitas (as "thisness") in developing an argument about conspicuous detail in aesthetic literary criticism.

See also

 Entitativity
 Formal distinction
 Haecceitism
 Hypostasis
 Identity of indiscernibles
 Irreducibility
 Objective precision
 Open individualism
 Ostensive definition 
 Personal identity
 Principle of individuation
 Quiddity
 Rigid designation
 Scotism
 Scotistic realism
 Ship of Theseus
 Sine qua non
 Cf. Sanskrit tathata, "thus-ness"
 Type-token distinction
 Vertiginous question

References

Further reading
E. Gilson, The Philosophy of the Middle Ages (1955)
A. Heuser, The Shaping Vision of Gerard Manley Hopkins (OUP 1955)
E. Longpre, La Philosophie du B. Duns Scotus (Paris 1924)
Gilles Deleuze and Félix Guattari. 1980. A Thousand Plateaus. Trans. Brian Massumi. London and New York: Continuum, 2004. Vol. 2 of Capitalism and Schizophrenia. 2 vols. 1972–1980. Trans. of Mille Plateaux. Paris: Les Editions de Minuit. ISBN
Gilles Deleuze and Félix Guattari.  1991/1994. "What is Philosophy?".  Trans. Hugh Tomlinson and Gregory Burchell.  New York: Columbia University Press, 1994.
Harold Garfinkel, 'Evidence for Locally Produced, Naturally Accountable Phenomena of Order, Logic, Meaning, Method, etc., in and as of the Essentially Unavoidable and Irremediable Haecceity of Immortal Ordinary Society', Sociological Theory Spring 1988, (6)1:103-109

External links

Singularity
Stanford Encyclopedia of Philosophy article — "Medieval Theories of Haecceity"

Essentialism
Ontology
Scotism